AI Entertainment Inc. was founded in 2007. It is a Japanese indie record label and publishing company which supports the indie artists of the world.

Artists
F.T. Island (2009-)
 螢園 鄭明子 : ハングル書芸家 (2012-)
 canna (2014-)

Former artists
CNBLUE (2009-2011)

Magazine

AIM (Asia Interest Magazine)
 AIM ISSUE 0 Korean Food Red VS White
 AIM ISSUE 1 Kimchi & Kimjang -Making and Sharing Kimchi
 AIM ISSUE 2 Korean Beauty and Cosmetic
 AIM ISSUE 3 韓方 HANBANG
 AIM ISSUE 4 Korean Spiritueality
 AIM ISSUE 5 Templestay in Korea

Education business
AICC (Asia Interest Culture Center)

See also
 List of record labels

External links
 

Japanese record labels
Japanese independent record labels
Record labels established in 2007